The lawn bowls competition at the 1934 British Empire Games took place at the Temple Bowling Club in Denmark Hill and the Paddington Bowling Club in Maida Vale, London from 4–11 August 1934.

Scotland won the singles event and England won both the pairs and rinks events.

Medal table

Medal summary

Men's singles – round robin

Results

Men's pairs – round robin

Results

Men's rinks (fours) – round robin

Results

References

See also
List of Commonwealth Games medallists in lawn bowls
Lawn bowls at the Commonwealth Games

Lawn bowls at the Commonwealth Games
1934 British Empire Games events
Brit